Pabstiella aryter is a species of orchid plant native to Peru.

References 

aryter
Flora of Peru
Plants described in 1976